The San Diego Hall of Champions was an American multi-sport museum in San Diego, California until its closure in June 2017. The Hall of Champions housed the Breitbard Hall of Fame - San Diego's sports hall of fame - which is now located at Petco Park.

Breitbard Hall of Fame

The Breitbard Hall of Fame was established in 1953 by Robert Breitbard. It honors athletes who either (1) have excelled in sports in San Diego or (2) are native San Diegans who have excelled in sports elsewhere. As of 2008, 117 athletes have been inducted, representing 20 sports: archery; badminton and tennis; baseball; basketball; bowling; boxing; diving and swimming; football; figure skating; golf; hockey; horse racing; marksmanship; motor sports; pole vaulting; sailing; skateboarding; soccer; track and field; triathlon; and wrestling. New members are inducted in February at the Salute to the Champions dinner.

Eligibility
To be eligible for enshrinement, the candidate must meet these criteria:
An athlete, coach or special contributor native to San Diego county or who represented a San Diego high school, university, sports organization or professional team
Professional athletes not native to San Diego county must have spent at least 4 years of their career in San Diego
Athletes must be retired for at least 2 years or be at least 50 years old
Coaches and contributors do not need to be retired, but must have spent at least 7 years working in their field

Inductees

For each inductee's San Diego connection, see footnote

See also
San Diego Chargers Hall of Fame, local American football team's hall of fame
San Diego Padres Hall of Fame, local baseball team's hall of fame
California Sports Hall of Fame

References

External links

San Diego Hall of Champions official website
Breitbard Hall of Fame webpage. San Diego Hall of Champions website

Sports museums in California
Museums in San Diego
Sports in San Diego
International Sports Heritage Association
Balboa Park (San Diego)
Museums established in 1959
1959 establishments in California